A silent partner is one who shares in the profits and losses of a business, but is not involved in its management.

Silent partner or Silent Partners may also refer to:

Arts and entertainment 
 Silent Partner, a 2005 film starring Tara Reid and Nick Moran
 The Silent Partner (1917 film), a silent film drama produced by Jesse Lasky
 The Silent Partner (1923 film), a silent film drama produced by Famous Players-Lasky
 The Silent Partner (1931 film), a silent film drama directed by Roy Mack
 The Silent Partner (1939 film), an Italian drama film
 The Silent Partner (1978 film), a Canadian crime film starring Elliott Gould and Christopher Plummer
 The Silent Partner (soundtrack), the soundtrack for the 1978 film
 Silent Partner (1944 film), an American thriller film
 Silent Partner (2001 film), an Australian film
 "The Silent Partners", a Season 4 episode of The Venture Bros. American animated TV series
 "Silent Partners", a 1984 song by Laura Branigan from Self Control (album)
 "Silent Partners", a 1984 song by David Frizzell and Shelly West

Other uses 
 Silent Partner, a memoir by Dina Matos, former First Lady of New Jersey
 Silent partner (climbing), a piece of climbing equipment
 The Silent Partner (novel), a historical-fiction novel by Elizabeth Stuart Phelps Ward